La Chapelle-Saint-Luc is a commune in the Aube department in north-central France, right next to Troyes.

Population

See also
 Communes of the Aube department

References

External links

 Chaource tourism website

Communes of Aube
Aube communes articles needing translation from French Wikipedia